Celia Feinman Adler (December 6, 1889 – January 31, 1979) was an American actress, known as the "First Lady of the Yiddish Theatre".

Early life
She was born in New York City, as Tzirele Adler (soon after known as Celia), the daughter of Jacob Adler and Dinah Shtettin, who were both actors in the Yiddish theater. She was the half-sister of Stella Adler, Luther Adler, and Jacob Adler's five other children. Unlike Stella and Luther, who became well known for their work with the Group Theater, their film work and as theorists of the craft of acting, she was almost exclusively a stage actress. 

Celia's mother, Dinah Shtettin, was the second wife of Jacob Adler. The couple had met and married in London, and they arrived in the United States from there shortly before Celia's birth. They divorced when Celia was a young child, although they continued to work together in the theater. Stettin subsequently married the actor and playwright Sigmund Feinmann. Celia used her stepfather's last name when she was growing up but later changed her name to "Adler" for her stage career.

Career
After playing many child roles in the Yiddish theater, Adler distanced herself from the theater for a time during her teenage years, but then resumed her acting career with the encouragement of the actress Bertha Kalisch, with whom she co-starred in a production of Hermann Sudermann's play Heimat. 
She was associated with the Yiddish Art Theater movement of the 1920s and 1930s. She also gave one of the first theatrical portrayals of a Holocaust survivor, in Luther Adler's 1946 Broadway production of A Flag Is Born (written by Ben Hecht and featuring a 22-year-old Marlon Brando, Stella Adler's prize pupil in method acting). Adler, along with co-stars Paul Muni and Marlon Brando, refused to accept compensation above the Actor's Equity minimum wage because of her commitment to the cause of creating a Jewish State in Israel. 

In 1937, Celia Adler starred in the Henry Lynn Yiddish film, Where Is My Child. From 1937-1952, she appeared in several films and television programs. Her last film was a 1985 British documentary with archive footage, Almonds and Raisins, narrated by, among others, Orson Welles, Herschel Bernardi and Seymour Rechzeit.

Personal life
She was married three times, to actor Lazar Freed, theatrical manager Jack Cone, and businessman Nathan Forman. She and Freed married in 1914; they had one child, and divorced in 1919. In 1930 Adler married Cone, who was her manager at the time; he died in 1959. Later that same year she married Forman, who died just one month before Adler, in 1979.

Death
She is buried in the Yiddish Theatre Section of Mount Hebron Cemetery in New York City having died  from a heart attack.

References

External links

 
 Judith Laikin Elkin, Celia Adler, Jewish Women Encyclopedia

Adler Family Papers.; P-890; American Jewish Historical Society, Boston, MA and New York, NY.

1889 births
1979 deaths
Burials at Mount Hebron Cemetery (New York City)
American stage actresses
American television actresses
Jewish American actresses
Actresses from New York City
Yiddish theatre performers
20th-century American actresses
American film actresses